Wood Brothers may refer to the following:
 Wood Brothers Racing, an American auto racing team
 The Wood Brothers, musical siblings Chris and Oliver Wood
 Wood Brothers TV, TV presenter siblings Danny, Ben and Sam Wood